Louis-Phillipe Jean (born August 15, 1984) is a Canadian strongman competitor and entrant to the World's Strongest Man competition on multiple occasions.

Strongman career
Louis-Phillipe Jean began competing in strongman at the age of 17 and won the Quebec Cup at the age of 22, the youngest man to ever win the title. He came third in his first appearance at Canada's Strongest Man in 2006. Louis soon began competing on the international circuit and was invited to the Strongman Super Series in 2007.

In 2008, Jean became Canada's Strongest Man, the youngest man to ever win the title, and also finished in fourth place at Fortissimus in Quebec. Jean won the Overhead Power Medley event at the Fortissimus contest.

Jean was named "Canada's Strongman of the Year" by Fortissimus World Strength in 2008 after winning Canada's Strongest Man, his high placing at Fortissimus, and becoming the youngest Canadian to ever qualify for World's Strongest Man.

Jean was invited to the 2008 World's Strongest Man contest, although he failed to make the finals. In 2009, Jean did make the final of the 2009 World's Strongest Man in Valletta, Malta, finishing in 10th place. Jean returned to the 2010 World's Strongest Man contest in Sun City, South Africa but failed to make the finals.

Jean broke the Canadian log lift world record on April 30, 2011, by lifting .

Personal life
Jean married Kim Des Becquets on August 20, 2011. The wedding took place at the Saint-Charles-Borromée church in Quebec City. Fellow strongman competitor, training partner and close friend Derek Poundstone was a groomsman at the wedding.

Jean reportedly trained so hard with Poundstone during the days prior to the wedding in preparation for the 2011 World's Strongest Man contest, that he had difficulty walking down the aisle for the ceremony.

Personal Records

Strongman
Log lift for max weight:  Canadian national record
Apollon's Axle:  for repetitions,  for max weight
Best powerlifting total :  as a junior
12 junior powerlifting world records : WPO, CPU.

Powerlifting
done in official meets
Squat :  raw with wraps wearing neoprene shorts
Bench press :  raw
Deadlift :  raw
 Total :  raw with wraps wearing neoprene shorts

References

1984 births
Living people
Canadian strength athletes
People from Côte-Nord
Sportspeople from Quebec
French Quebecers